The 2011 V8 Supercar season was the fifteenth season of V8 Supercar motor racing and the fifteenth season in which V8 Supercars have contested the premier Australian touring car series. It was the 52nd year of touring car racing in Australia beginning with the 1960 season, which included the first Australian Touring Car Championship, now known as the International V8 Supercars Championship, and the first Armstrong 500, the fore-runner of the present day Bathurst 1000.

The 2011 season began on 11 February at the Yas Marina Circuit in Abu Dhabi and ended on 4 December at the Homebush Street Circuit. It featured the fifteenth V8 Supercar Championship, consisting of 26 races at 14 events covering all six states and the Northern Territory of Australia as well as events in the United Arab Emirates and New Zealand. There was also a stand-alone non-championship event supporting the 2011 Australian Grand Prix. The season also featured the twelfth second-tier V8 Supercar Development Series, this year officially known as the Fujitsu V8 Supercar Series and expanded to a seven-round series. The fourth third-tier series, the Kumho V8 Touring Car Series was contested over a five-round series.

Race calendar
Dates sourced from:

VSC – International V8 Supercar Championship
FVS – Fujitsu V8 Supercar Series
KVTC – Kumho V8 Touring Car Series
NC – Non-championship round

International V8 Supercars Championship

Fujitsu V8 Supercar Series

Albert Park 400

Kumho V8 Touring Car Series

References

External links
 Official V8 Supercar website

Supercar seasons